USS Drexler (DD-741), an Allen M. Sumner-class destroyer, was named for Ensign Henry Clay Drexler, a Medal of Honor recipient.

The Drexler was launched on 3 September 1944 by Bath Iron Works Corp., in Bath, Maine; sponsored by Mrs. L. A. Drexler, the mother of Ensign Drexler; and commissioned on 14 November 1944.

Service history
Sailing from Norfolk on 23 January 1945 to escort  to Trinidad, Drexler then sailed on to reach San Diego on 10 February. Three days later she got underway for Pearl Harbor for antiaircraft and shore bombardment exercises until the 23rd, when she sailed on escort duty to Guadalcanal and Ulithi, the staging area for the Okinawa invasion.

Drexler departed Ulithi 27 March 1945 bound for Okinawa and duty on a radar picket station. The first was downed by the combined fire of the two destroyers and planes from the combat air patrol. The second tried to crash onto Lowry but missed, hitting Drexler instead and cutting off all power and starting large gasoline fires. Despite the heavy damage, she kept firing, aiding in shooting down two planes which attacked immediately after the crash. Because of the speed with which she sank, casualties were heavy: 168 dead and 52 wounded. The captain was one of the wounded.

Awards
Drexler received one battle star for World War II service.

References

Brown, David. Warship Losses of World War Two. Arms and Armour, London, Great Britain, 1990.  .

External links

navsource.org: USS Drexler
hazegray.org: USS Drexler
 Home Port of the U.S.S. Drexler Survivors' Reunion Association (Official website of the Organization)
Oral history interview with William Burrows, a seaman on the Drexler, describing the sinking  from the Veterans History Project at Central Connecticut State University

Drexler (DD-741)
Ships built in Bath, Maine
World War II shipwrecks in the Pacific Ocean
1944 ships
Allen M. Sumner-class destroyers of the United States Navy
Ships sunk by kamikaze attack
Maritime incidents in May 1945